Sheikh Khairy Khedr (? – October 2014) was the Commander and founder of the Yazidi militia Malik Al-Tawus Troop, which later became the Sinjar Resistance Units (YBŞ). He was born in Siba Sheikh Khidir (Jazeera).

The community of Siba Sheikh Khidir is located about 20 km south of the Sinjar Mountains. Siba Sheikh Khidir was one of the first settlements attacked by the Islamic State (IS) on 3 August 2014 at the beginning of the Sinjar massacre. The village is also one of the two villages that was almost completely destroyed in the 2007 Yazidi communities bombings.

Commander of Sinjar Resistance Units Sheikh Khairy Khedr was killed in action during the October 2014 clashes in Sinjar. He was mortally wounded, on October 22, by an Islamic State mortar bomb that also wounded a second Sinjar Resistance Unit fighter and killed another, and he died five hours later. Medical assistance was not available in time because the fighters and many Yazidi civilians had been surrounded on Sinjar Mountain. Yazidi fighters said that they were armed mostly with rifles, but the Islamic State forces used rockets and missiles as well as the mortar attacks.

External links 

Iraqi Yazidis
2014 deaths
People from Nineveh Governorate